is a Japanese businessman, former vice chairman and president of Sony Corporation. He joined the company in 1977, later replacing Kunitake Andō to become president of the firm March 7, 2005. He was replaced as president by Howard Stringer on April 1, 2009. Chūbachi retired from Sony on March 31, 2013. Currently he is the president of the National Institute of Advanced Industrial Science and Technology (AIST), an independent administrative institution (agency) of the Ministry of Economy, Trade and Industry.

Chubachi had managed Sony's device and materials businesses and technology development. He was appointed President of Sony Corporation in 2005, with responsibility for the entire electronics business. Subsequently, in 2009, Chubashi was appointed to Vice Chairman.

In 2013, Chubachi retired from Sony and became President of the National Institute of Advanced Industrial Science and Technology (AIST), an independent administrative institution widely regarded as one of Japan’s leading public research facilities in areas such as the environment, energy, life science, information technology and electronics.

External links

 https://web.archive.org/web/20100626132908/http://www.sony.net/SonyInfo/IR/investors/8ido18000001wf8n-att/copy_of_nts92.pdf
 http://www.sony.net/SonyInfo/News/Press/201303/13-033E

1947 births
Living people
Japanese businesspeople
Sony people
Tohoku University alumni